The South African Railways Class 8E  of 1903 was a steam locomotive from the pre-Union era in the Cape of Good Hope.

In 1903, at the same time that the Cape Government Railways ordered its second batch of 38 8th Class  Mastodon type steam locomotives, four additional experimental locomotives of the same class were ordered, built to modified specifications to accommodate a larger firegrate area. In 1912, when these four locomotives were assimilated into the South African Railways, they were renumbered and designated .

Manufacture

Evolution
The first Cape Government Railways (CGR) 8th Class locomotive was a  Consolidation type, designed by H.M. Beatty, the CGR's Chief Locomotive Superintendent from 1896 to 1910. These locomotives were later to become the South African Railways (SAR) Class 8X. While these first Schenectady- and ALCO-built  locomotives were being subjected to exhaustive testing on all types of traffic and under varying conditions, some trouble was experienced with the leading two-wheeled pony truck and, when designs were prepared at Salt River for a later order for more locomotives, the pony truck was replaced with a four-wheeled bogie, which resulted in the CGR's  Mastodon type 8th Class.

In spite of the difference in wheel arrangements, the CGR's  Consolidations and post-7th Class  Mastodons were all grouped together as the 8th Class.

Design
In 1902, when a second batch of 38 8th Class  locomotives was ordered, later to become the Class 8D on the SAR, an additional four engines were ordered. These were of an experimental design, built to modified specifications.

Beatty believed that, while the earlier 8th Class locomotives (later the SAR Class 8) steamed well, they would steam even better if they had a larger firegrate area. He was hampered by the fact that the firebox wrapper plates had to fit between the rearmost coupled wheels. He overcame this by designing an 8th Class locomotive with a deep curve in the foundation ring (mud ring) to clear the intermediate coupled wheels and a steep slope towards the rear to clear the trailing wheels.

Builders
The locomotives were ordered from Neilson, Reid and Company and delivered in 1903. They were delivered with Type XE1 tenders, numbered in the range from 813 to 816 and allocated to the Western System of the CGR.

Class 8 sub-classes
When the Union of South Africa was established on 31 May 1910, the three Colonial government railways (CGR, Natal Government Railways and Central South African Railways) were united under a single administration to control and administer the railways, ports and harbours of the Union. Although the South African Railways and Harbours came into existence in 1910, the actual classification and renumbering of all the rolling stock of the three constituent railways were only implemented with effect from 1 January 1912.

These locomotives, together with the rest of the CGR's fleet of 8th Class  Consolidations and 8th Class  Mastodons, plus the Classes  to   Mastodon locomotives from the Central South African Railways, were grouped into ten different sub-classes by the SAR. The  locomotives became SAR Classes 8 and 8A to 8F, while the  locomotives became Classes 8X to 8Z.

In 1912, these four locomotives were renumbered in the range from 1230 to 1233 and designated Class 8E on the SAR.

Modifications

Reboilering
With no appreciable gain obtained in steaming capacity, the enlarged grate area on these experimental locomotives did not come up to expectations. Since the fireboxes began to have problems with cracks and leaking rivets soon after the locomotives were placed in service, the experimental boilers and fireboxes were soon replaced with standard 8th Class boilers and fireboxes.

Superheating
During A.G. Watson's term as the Chief Mechanical Engineer (CME) of the SAR from 1929 to 1936, many of the Class 8 to Class 8F locomotives were equipped with superheated boilers, larger bore cylinders and either inside or outside admission piston valves.

Of the four Class 8E locomotives, numbers 1232 and 1233 were equipped with superheated boilers,  bore cylinders and outside admission piston valves, while retaining their Class 8E classification.

Service
In SAR service, the  Class 8 family of locomotives worked on every system in the country and, during the 1920s, became the mainstay of motive power on many branch lines. Their final days were spent in shunting service. By 1972, they were all withdrawn from service.

References

1570
1570
4-8-0 locomotives
2D locomotives
Neilson Reid locomotives
Cape gauge railway locomotives
Railway locomotives introduced in 1903
1903 in South Africa
Scrapped locomotives